University of Kyrenia is the first university of Northern Cyprus specializing on maritime studies was established in 2013 in Kyrenia. There are now 12 faculties, 3 vocational schools, 3 graduate schools and an academy, in total 58 programs.

Faculties

Faculty Of Maritime Studies
 Maritime Transportation Management Engineering (Deck)
 Marine Engineering

Faculty Of Marine Sciences
 Fishers Technology Engineering

Faculty Of Maritime Management And Administration
 Maritime Management Administration

Faculty Of Dentistry
 Department of Dentistry

Faculty Of Education
 English Language Teaching
 Psychological Counseling And Guidance
 Special Education Teaching
 Turkish Language Teaching

 Faculty Of Aviation And Space Sciences
 Aviation Management
 Pilotage – Professional Pilot Training
 Aeronautical Engineering

Faculty of Law
 Department of Law

Faculty Of Economics And Administrative Sciences
 Banking And Finance
 Business Administrations
 Logistics Management
 Social Work
 Tourism and Hotel Management
 International Relations

Faculty Of Architecture
 Interior Design
 Architecture

Faculty Of Engineering
 Computer Engineering
 Electrical And Electronic Engineering
 Civil Engineering
 Mechanical Engineering

Faculty of Health Sciences
 Physiotherapy and Rehabilitation
 Nursing

Faculty of Medicine
 Basic Sciences Division
 Medical Sciences Division
 Surgical Sciences Division

Applied Schools 
Maritime Applied School
 Marine Engineering
 Maritime Transportation And Management Engineering (Deck)

Vocational Schools
Maritime Vocational School
 Maritime Transportation and Management
 Maritime Management and Operations
 Ship Machinery

Vocational School Of Health Services
 Mouth and Dental Health
 Anesthesia
 Physiotherapy
 Emergency and First Aid
 Medical Documentation and Secretarial
 Medical Laboratory Technician

References

Educational institutions established in 2013
Universities in Northern Cyprus
Universities and colleges in Cyprus
2013 establishments in Northern Cyprus
Kyrenia